Jean Cottez (born 29 May 1905) was a French rower. He competed at the 1936 Summer Olympics in Berlin with the men's eight where they were eliminated in the semi-final.

References

1905 births
Year of death missing
French male rowers
Olympic rowers of France
Rowers at the 1936 Summer Olympics
European Rowing Championships medalists
20th-century French people